Fred Diodati is the lead singer of The Four Aces.  He has intermittently been the lead singer of the Four Aces since 1958, when he replaced Al Alberts.  He currently leads a band who refers to themselves as The Four Aces, though all of the songs he and his group sing originate from the Original Four Aces:  Al Alberts, Lou Silvestri, Dave Mahoney, and Sod Vicarro.

Diodati was born in Chester, Pennsylvania and attended South Philadelphia High School.

References 

Living people
South Philadelphia High School alumni
People from Chester, Pennsylvania
Musicians from Philadelphia
American male pop singers
Traditional pop music singers
Date of birth missing (living people)
Singers from Pennsylvania
Year of birth missing (living people)